Alabuga may refer to:

 Yelabuga, a town in the Republic of Tatarstan, Russia
 Alabuga (economic zone), a Special Economic Zone in this republic
 Ala-Buga, a river in Kyrgyzstan, tributary of the Naryn